Shanti Kumar Desai (3 March 1908 – 6 January 1986) also credited as Shanti Kumar, was an Indian music director who gave music to Hindi films between 1934 -1964.

Personal life 

He was born to a Gujarati family in Amreli in Saurashtra, Bombay Presidency, India. His mother is Kunwarben and father is Shri Pritamlal Desai. He married Shantagauri Kanakiya. He died on 6 January 1986, survived by five children, 2 sons and 3 daughters and grandchildren.

Career 

He learned music early and gave concerts to the royal families of that time. During the 3rd decade of the 20th century, he came to Mumbai and took a job of a broadcaster in HMV. He was exposed to composition and music arrangement for Indian Cinema. He became a disciple of Shri Aman Ali Khan.

Initially he gave music to a theater group in Bhangwadi area of Mumbai. He got his first break in the movie Navbharat from Victory Pictures in 1934. He worked with veteran singers of that time including Johrabai Ambawali, Rajkumari, Ameerbai Karnataki, Sardar Akhtar and Pinakin Shah. He composed for around 40 movies.

He was also known as a harmonium player. In that era, music used harmonium and tabla only.

Filmography

External links 

 
 
 
 
 Newspaper - Divya Bhaskar : 22 August 2008, 5 March 2010

References 

1908 births
1986 deaths
Gujarati people
People from Amreli district
Hindi film score composers
20th-century composers
20th-century Indian musicians